Thomas Edward Scanlon (September 18, 1896 – August 9, 1955) was a Democratic member of the U.S. House of Representatives from Pennsylvania.

Biography 
Tom Scanlon was born in Pittsburgh, Pennsylvania.  He attended the public schools, Forbes School, and Duquesne University in Pittsburgh, Pennsylvania.  He learned the pressman’s trade and was employed on Pittsburgh newspapers from 1914 to 1936.  During the First World War served as a private, first class, in the United States Army from September 6, 1918, to May 14, 1919.  He was a delegate to the Pittsburgh Central Labor Union from 1920 to 1940, and a member of the Allegheny County Board for the Assessment and Revision of Taxes from 1936 to 1941.

Scanlon was elected as a Democrat to the 77th and 78th Congresses.  He was an unsuccessful candidate for reelection in 1944.  After serving in congress he was a member of the Boards of Viewers of Allegheny County, Pennsylvania.  He died in Pittsburgh, PA, and is interred in North Side Catholic Cemetery.

Sources 
 

1896 births
1955 deaths
Duquesne University alumni
Politicians from Pittsburgh
Democratic Party members of the United States House of Representatives from Pennsylvania
20th-century American politicians